This list of Heritage New Zealand-listed places in Southland District contains those buildings and structures that are listed with Heritage New Zealand (formerly known as Historic Places Trust) in the Southland District of New Zealand.

Heritage New Zealand is a Crown entity and the national heritage agency. With a head office in Wellington, the Dunedin area office is responsible for the Southland Region.

McCallum's Shed in Winton was listed as a Category I historic place with registration number 3268 until it was demolished in 2014.

References

History of Southland, New Zealand
Southland District